Robert English may refer to:
Robert D. English (born 1958), American historian
Robert Henry English (1888–1943), American admiral
Robert English (actor) (1878–?), British actor
Robert English Coast, a portion of the coast of Antarctica